The 2017 BWF Super Series Finals, officially known as Dubai World Superseries Finals 2017, was the season-ending competition of the 2017 BWF Super Series. It was held from 13 to 17 December 2017 in Dubai, United Arab Emirates. This was the last edition of the BWF Super Series Finals, as it has been replaced by the BWF World Tour Finals since 2018.

Representatives by Nation

§: Chen Qingchen from China was the only player who played in two categories (women's doubles and mixed doubles).

Performance by Nation

Men's singles

Seeds

Group A

Group B

Finals

Women's singles

Seeds

Withdrawn

Group A

Group B

Finals

Men's doubles

Seeds

Group A

Group B

Finals

Women's doubles

Seeds

Group A

Group B

Finals

Mixed doubles

Seeds

Withdrawn

Group A

Group B

Finals

References

External links
 Dubai World Superseries Finals at www.dubaisuperseriesfinals.ae
 BWF World Super Series at www.bwfworldsuperseries.com

BWF Super Series Finals
Superseries Finals
Sports competitions in Dubai
International sports competitions hosted by the United Arab Emirates
2017 in Emirati sport
BWF Super Series Finals
Badminton tournaments in the United Arab Emirates